Juan Carlos Garrido Fernández (born 29 March 1969) is a Spanish football manager.

He managed Villarreal and Betis in La Liga before working for several years in the Arab world, winning the CAF Confederation Cup with Egypt's Al Ahly and Morocco's Raja CA.

Football career

Villarreal
Born in Valencia, Garrido started managing at only 24, his first club being local amateurs El Puig Club de Fútbol. In the 1998–99 season he coached CD Onda in Tercera División as the side was Villarreal CF's farm team, a club to which he would be closely associated in the following years.

In 2003, Garrido led the reserves– Onda was now an independent team – to a fourth-division promotion, then was in charge of them for a couple of months in 2004 also in that tier. In October 2004, he was again named manager of the B side in the place of José del Solar, and narrowly missed out another promotion after finishing fifth.

After the appointment of Luis García as manager in May 2005, Garrido returned to his previous duties in the backroom staff. On 18 January 2008, he replaced sacked Juan Carlos Oliva at the helm of Villarreal B, eventually leading them to the 11th position in Segunda División B and achieving a first-ever Segunda División promotion the following campaign. 

On 1 February 2010, Garrido was appointed first-team manager following the dismissal of Ernesto Valverde after a 0–2 home loss against CA Osasuna. On 26 April, before the season in La Liga was over, he was handed a contract set to expire in June 2011; the side finished in seventh position but, after RCD Mallorca were deemed ineligible for participation in the UEFA Europa League by UEFA due to financial irregularities, the Valencians took their place.

In his first full season, Garrido led the club to the fourth place in the league, with the subsequent qualification to the UEFA Champions League. The team also reached the semi-finals in the Europa League, being ousted by eventual winners FC Porto.

Garrido and Villarreal could not manage one single point in the Champions League in 2011–12, and the latter ranked dangerously close to the relegation zone in the league in that period. On 21 December 2011, following a 0–2 home loss against CD Mirandés in the round of 32 of the Copa del Rey (1–3 on aggregate), he was sacked.

Club Brugge and Betis
On 15 November 2012, Garrido replaced fired Georges Leekens at Club Brugge KV. He was relieved of his duties in September of the following year, replacing fired Pepe Mel at the helm of Real Betis two months later; on 19 January 2014, after only nine official matches and only one win, he was himself sacked after three consecutive defeats – the last one in the league 5–0 at home to Real Madrid – and with the Andalusians finishing dead last.

Africa and Arabia
On 8 July 2014, Garrido was appointed at Al Ahly SC in the Egyptian Premier League. Late into the month, he led his new team to a 1–0 win against Séwé FC for the CAF Confederation Cup which the club eventually won, also conquering the Egyptian Super Cup; on 3 May 2015, however, he was dismissed. 

On 6 November 2016, Garrido was appointed manager of Ettifaq FC in the Saudi Professional League, signing a seven-month deal with an option for another season according to result and team performance. He was relieved of his duties the following February, with the side in eighth place after 22 matches.

Garrido switched clubs and countries again in June 2017, joining Raja CA from Morocco. His first game in charge of the latter took place on 10 September, in a 1–1 away draw against Olympique Club de Khouribga. He won the year's Throne Cup with a penalty shootout victory over Difaâ Hassani El Jadidi on 18 November, and a year later the CAF Confederation Cup with a 4–3 aggregate win over AS Vita Club from the Democratic Republic of the Congo.

A month after being sacked by Raja, in February 2019 Garrido replaced Zoran Mamić at UAE Pro League club Al Ain FC for the rest of the season. At its closure, he was succeeded by another Croat, Ivan Leko.

Garrido was hired by Tunisia's Étoile Sportive du Sahel on 20 November 2019, on a deal until June 2021. Less than three months later, however, he was dismissed due to poor results.

On 25 February 2020, Garrido returned to Casablanca, joining Raja's rivals Wydad AC. He was fired in September despite taking the team to the Champions League semi-finals, as they were trailing Raja by four points on the domestic front.

Garrido returned to Spain on 12 January 2021 after nearly seven years, being appointed manager of CD Castellón in the second division. He was dismissed on 21 May, as the club faced relegation with two games remaining.

On 20 September 2022, Garrido went back to Egypt's top flight, taking over at last-placed Ismaily SC. He was shown the door on 9 December, after taking two points from five games.

Managerial statistics

Honours
Al Ahly
Egyptian Super Cup: 2014
CAF Confederation Cup: 2014

Raja Casablanca
Moroccan Throne Cup: 2017
CAF Confederation Cup: 2018

References

External links

Official website

1969 births
Living people
Sportspeople from Valencia
Spanish football managers
La Liga managers
Segunda División managers
Segunda División B managers
Tercera División managers
Villarreal CF B managers
Villarreal CF managers
Real Betis managers
CD Castellón managers
Belgian Pro League managers
Club Brugge KV head coaches
Egyptian Premier League managers
Al Ahly SC managers
Ismaily SC managers
Saudi Professional League managers
Ettifaq FC managers
Botola managers
Raja CA managers
Wydad AC managers
UAE Pro League managers
Al Ain FC managers
Tunisian Ligue Professionnelle 1 managers
Étoile Sportive du Sahel managers
Spanish expatriate football managers
Expatriate football managers in Belgium
Expatriate football managers in Egypt
Expatriate football managers in Saudi Arabia
Expatriate football managers in Morocco
Expatriate football managers in the United Arab Emirates
Expatriate football managers in Tunisia
Spanish expatriate sportspeople in Belgium
Spanish expatriate sportspeople in Egypt
Spanish expatriate sportspeople in Saudi Arabia
Spanish expatriate sportspeople in Morocco
Spanish expatriate sportspeople in the United Arab Emirates
Spanish expatriate sportspeople in Tunisia